The 2021 Salinas Challenger was a professional tennis tournament played on hard courts. It was the 20th edition of the tournament which was part of the 2021 ATP Challenger Tour. It took place in Salinas, Ecuador between 19 and 25 April 2021.

Singles main-draw entrants

Seeds

 1 Rankings as of 12 April 2021.

Other entrants
The following players received wildcards into the singles main draw:
  Diego Hidalgo
  Nicolás Jarry
  Antonio Cayetano March

The following players received entry from the qualifying draw:
  Facundo Díaz Acosta
  Marek Gengel
  Nicolás Mejía
  Tak Khunn Wang

Champions

Singles

  Nicolás Jarry def.  Nicolás Mejía 7–6(9–7), 6–1.

Doubles

 Miguel Ángel Reyes-Varela /  Fernando Romboli def.  Diego Hidalgo /  Skander Mansouri 7–5, 4–6, [10–2].

References

2021 ATP Challenger Tour
2021 in Ecuadorian sport
April 2021 sports events in South America